Paula Reto (born 3 May 1990) is a South African professional golfer who plays on the LPGA Tour.

Amateur career
Reto played field hockey and ran track in her youth and did not start playing golf until 2005. She played with the Purdue Boilermakers women's golf team between 2009 and 2012, and was a member of the 2010 NCAA National Championship team. She was a three-time First-Team All-Big Ten Conference selection (2011-2013), and a First-Team All-American in 2013. She earned an individual third place finish at the 2013 NCAA Championships and was named the 2013 Mary Fossum Award winner for low stroke average in the Big Ten Conference.

Reto won the Dixie Amateur back to back in 2011 and 2012. In 2012 she reached the quarterfinals of the U.S. Women's Amateur Championship, eliminated by eventual champion and the world's top-ranked amateur, Lydia Ko.

Professional career
Reto qualified for the LPGA Tour through Q-School on her first attempt in 2013 and turned professional. She tied for 13th place to earn full status for the 2014 season. She finished 77th on the 2014 official LPGA money list and was seventh in the Louise Suggs Rookie of the Year race. Reto recorded a solo third at the 2014 Yokohama Tire LPGA Classic. She had a three-shot lead in Prattville, Alabama after 36 holes and shared the lead after 54 holes.

In 2019 she was runner-up at the FireKeepers Casino Hotel Championship, two strokes behind Ssu-Chia Cheng.

Reto finished tied 16th at the 2016 Summer Olympics and qualified for the 2020 Summer Olympics, but was forced to withdraw due to the COVID-19 protocol.

She won her first LPGA Tour tournament at the Canadian Women's Open on 28 August 2022, scoring 62-69-67-67=265 (−19), for a one-stroke win over Nelly Korda and Choi Hye-jin. Her initial round 62 was a tournament record.

Amateur wins
2011 Dixie Amateur Championship
2012 Dixie Amateur Championship

Professional wins (2)

LPGA Tour wins (1)

Sunshine Ladies Tour wins (1)

Results in LPGA majors
Results not in chronological order.

CUT = missed the half-way cut
NT = no tournament
T = tied

LPGA Tour career summary

^ As of 2022 season
* Includes matchplay and other tournaments without a cut.

World ranking
Position in Women's World Golf Rankings at the end of each calendar year.

References

External links

Profile at Purdue University Athletics

South African female golfers
Purdue Boilermakers women's golfers
LPGA Tour golfers
Sunshine Tour golfers

Olympic golfers of South Africa

Golfers at the 2016 Summer Olympics
1990 births
Living people
20th-century South African women
21st-century South African women